Nyimalung Monastery is a Buddhist monastery in central Bhutan, not far from Prakhar. The monastery was founded by Doring Trulku in 1938, a lama who originally came from Dartesedo in Kham in eastern Tibet. The monastery underwent restoration in 2002. The monastery, home to around 100 monks is especially noted for its talented musicians and its large thangka, devoted by the Japanese, which attracts pilgrims to a festival in the 5th lunar month.

References

Buddhist monasteries in Bhutan
Nyingma monasteries and temples
Religious buildings and structures completed in 1938
Tibetan Buddhism in Bhutan